Doron Sebbag is an Israeli art patron and businessman.

Biography
Sabag is CEO of the human resources company ORS. He sits  on the board of directors of the Tel Aviv Museum of Art.
In 2002, Haaretz newspaper named Sabag as the most influential person on the Israeli art scene.He is the owner of a Tel Aviv boutique hotel where part of his collection is on show.

References

External links
 

Israeli Jews
Israeli chief executives
Year of birth missing (living people)
Living people